is a Japanese 4-panel manga series by Coolkyousinnjya. The chapters are released online and then published in print by Ichijinsha. The first volume was released on December 29, 2011 and the fifth volume was released on August 4, 2015. An anime adaptation began airing in Japan on October 4, 2014 and finished airing on December 25, 2014. A second season began airing on April 2, 2015 and finished airing on June 25, 2015.

Plot

The series centers around the daily lives of Kaoru, a hard working office lady, and her husband Hajime, who is an otaku, an obsessed fan of anime and manga culture, and who works as a blogger. Using popular anime and otaku tropes and in-jokes, the characters explore the conflicts and similarities between daily life and otaku culture in urban Japan. The witty dialogue accentuates the animation and sometimes slips into manzai-style humor.

Characters

A 25-year-old office lady who is adjusting to married life with Hajime who is an otaku. She becomes pregnant near the end of the series.

Kaoru's 23-year-old otaku  who initially scrapes by living as a blogger who reviews various forms of nerd media from video games to anime. He eventually starts working as a web designer.

Hajime's cross-dressing younger brother. A popular Boys Love manga artist with a slightly perverted sense of humor.

A manga enthusiast and director at a data entry company.

Kaoru's close friend since high school who's now married to Nozomu Juse.

Mature and good looking. Tends to forget that Rino is older than him and always treat Rino carefully.

Kaoru's father. He is very protective of Kaoru and is a highly skilled chef.

Kaoru's other close friend since high school who's now married to Yamada-san.

Media

Manga

Anime
An anime television series adaptation began airing in October 2014. Crunchyroll began streaming the series on October 4, 2014. The episodes are approximately three minutes long. The thirteenth episode announced that the series had been green-lit for a second season, which premiered in April 2015.

Episode list

Season 1

Season 2

References

External links
 Official manga site 
 Official anime website 
 

2010s webcomics
Anime series based on manga
Comedy anime and manga
Crunchyroll anime
Ichijinsha manga
Japanese comedy webcomics
Marriage in anime and manga
Otaku in fiction
Seinen manga
Seven (animation studio)
Slice of life anime and manga
Television shows based on Japanese webcomics
Webcomics in print
Yonkoma